Antony Ranieri (21 June 1997) is a professional footballer who plays a striker for Championnat National 2 side Monaco B. Born in Italy, he is a former France youth international.

Club career
Ranieri is a youth exponent from Nice. He made his Ligue 1 debut on 10 January 2016 against Lille, replacing Hatem Ben Arfa after 88 minutes in a 1–1 away draw.

International career
On 5 March 2013, Ranieri made his first appearance for the France under-16 team, starting in a 4–2 friendly loss against Romania in Mogoșoaia.

References

External links
 

1997 births
Living people
Footballers from Bari
Association football forwards
French footballers
France youth international footballers
Italian footballers
Italian emigrants to France
OGC Nice players
US Colomiers Football players
RC Grasse players
SC Toulon players
AS Monaco FC players
Championnat National 2 players
Ligue 1 players
Championnat National players
French people of Italian descent